Thomas Enqvist and Mark Philippoussis successfully defended their title, defeating Jacco Eltingh and Paul Haarhuis in the final, 3–6, 6–3, [10–3] to win the gentlemen's invitation doubles tennis title at the 2014 Wimbledon Championships.

Draw

Final

Group A
Standings are determined by: 1. number of wins; 2. number of matches; 3. in two-players-ties, head-to-head records; 4. in three-players-ties, percentage of sets won, or of games won; 5. steering-committee decision.

Group B
Standings are determined by: 1. number of wins; 2. number of matches; 3. in two-players-ties, head-to-head records; 4. in three-players-ties, percentage of sets won, or of games won; 5. steering-committee decision.

References
Draw

Men's Invitation Doubles